Outlaw Gentlemen & Shady Ladies was a concert tour by Danish rock group, Volbeat in support for the album Outlaw Gentlemen & Shady Ladies from 2013.

During this tour Volbeat started play clubs in Denmark, playing at the biggest festivals in Europe, visited Japan and Australia, did an arena tour in Europe, and toured United States multiple times. In 2014 they did 2 big outdoor shows in Denmark, attended by 35.000 people. 

They ended the tour in Odense and played to a record crowd of 35.000 people. 

This was the first your with Rob Caggiano on lead guitar and the last tour for Anders Kjølholm on bass.

Set list
This set list is representative of the June 14, 2014 show in Sölvesburg. It does not represent all dates of the tour.

 "Doc Holiday"
 "Hallelujah Goat"
 "Boa (JDM)"
 "Lola Montez"
 "Sad Man's Tongue"
 "Heaven Nor Hell"
 "A Warrior's Call"
 "16 Dollars"
 "Dead but Rising"
 "Fallen"
 "A Broken Man and the Dawn/Mary Ann's Place/Rebel Monster/Making Believe"
 "Evelyn"
 "Radio Girl"
 "Cape of Our Hero"
 "Maybellene I Hofteholder"
 "Still Counting"

Encore
 "Pool of Booze, Booze, Booza"
 "A Hangman's Body Count"
 "Guitar Gangsters & Cadillac Blood"
 "The Mirror and The Ripper"

Tour Dates

Personnel 
Michael Poulsen (Vocal & Rhythm Guitar)
Anders Kjølholm (Bass & Backing Vocals)
Rob Caggiano (Lead Guitar & Backing Vocals)
Jon Larsen (Drums)

References

External links
 

2013 concert tours
2014 concert tours
2015 concert tours
Volbeat concert tours